Araya is a town located on Venezuela's Caribbean coast, on the westernmost extremity of the Araya Peninsula.

Araya Fortress
The Araya Fortress is a beige-brown stone masonry fortification. The fortification was built in order to defend Araya and the Araya Peninsula against Caribbean pirates.

The Spanish Empire only focused on the pearls that could be found off the coast. Because this area had the largest salt plains in the country, the Dutch and the English started extracting the salt, an important product at that time.

When the pearl harvesting came to an end, the Spanish used the fort to defend the salt plains against the English and the Dutch. The fort was abandoned after a hurricane destroyed the area and the salt reserves were lost.

References

External links

Images of Araya fortress

Populated places in Sucre (state)